Mombarcaro is a comune (municipality) in the Province of Cuneo in the Italian region Piedmont, located about  southeast of Turin and about  east of Cuneo.

Mombarcaro borders the following municipalities: Camerana, Gorzegno, Monesiglio, Murazzano, Niella Belbo, Paroldo, Prunetto, Sale San Giovanni, and San Benedetto Belbo.

Demographic evolution

References

Cities and towns in Piedmont